Christopher Rivas (born ) is an American author, actor, podcaster, and storyteller. He is best known for his podcast Rubirosa, his book Brown Enough, the role of Oscar on Call Me Kat, and his solo play, The Real James Bond… Was Dominican!

Life and career
The son of a Dominican father and Colombian mother. He attended California Institute of the Arts, where he majored in acting in 2011. He developed storytelling workshops United Nations High Commission for Refugees, LAMP on Skid Row, The Museum of Broken Relationships, UCLA and CalArts. In 2018, he was part of the faculty of The Ariane de Rothschild Fellowship.

Filmography

References

External links
 
 

Living people
1980s births
Year of birth missing (living people)
American storytellers
American male film actors
20th-century American male actors
21st-century American male actors